Christine Pringle was one of the founders of the C3 Church (Christian City Church) movement. She is the wife of Australian pastor Phil Pringle.

References

External links
C3 Sydney website
C3 Church Global website
Chris Pringle bio at CCC Oxford Falls site

Australian evangelicals
Australian Pentecostals
Living people
Year of birth missing (living people)